Protoparevania is an extinct genus of Evaniidae from the Cretaceous.

References
 Paleo Bugs: Survival of the Creepiest by Timothy J. Bradley

Evanioidea
Prehistoric Hymenoptera genera
Cretaceous insects
Prehistoric insects of Asia
Fossil taxa described in 2004